Artavasdes IV (also spelled Artabasdes) was a legendary figure, who is mentioned as the "king of the Armenians" under the Sasanian monarch Shapur I in the Historia Augusta.

References

Sources

See also
 Arsacid dynasty of Armenia
 List of Armenian kings

3rd-century kings of Armenia
3rd-century monarchs in Asia
Kings of Armenia
Legendary Armenian people
Legendary Iranian people